CHRP may refer to:
Common Hardware Reference Platform
Certified Human Resources Professional
Trigeneration